Chahar Cheshmeh Rural District is a rural district (dehestan) in Kamareh District, Khomeyn County, Markazi Province, Iran. At the 2006 census, its population was 6,852, in 1,763 families. The rural district has 25 villages.

References 

Rural Districts of Markazi Province
Khomeyn County